The fifth edition of the Dutch Supercup was held on 21 August 1994 in the Olympic Stadium in Amsterdam. The match featured the winners of the 1993–94 Eredivisie, Ajax, and the winners of the 1993-94 KNVB Cup, Feyenoord. The game was won by Ajax 3–0, with the goals coming from Jari Litmanen, Tarik Oulida and Patrick Kluivert.

PTT (an acronym for Posterijen, Telegrafie en Telefonie (Dutch for Postoffice, Telegraph and Telephone)), had been the corporate sponsors since the re-inauguration of the Supercup in 1991, with the competition being known as the PTT Telecom Cup. However, they withdrew their sponsorship for the 1994 edition of the cup. This led to the name reverting to 'Dutch Supercup', a name which was retained until 1996 when the competition became known as the Johan Cruyff Shield.

This would be the last Dutch Supercup to be played at the Olympic Stadium; in 1995, the games would be played at the De Kuip, with all subsequent cups, under the title of the Johan Cruyff Shield, being played at the Amsterdam Arena.

Match details

 

1994
Supercup
D
D
Dutch Supercup